Rachel Kuehn (born June 6, 2001) is an American amateur golfer.

Early life and family
Kuehn was born 2001 in Asheville, North Carolina to an athletic family. Her grandfather Jack Corrie represented Venezuela in the 1958 Eisenhower Trophy and played golf and basketball at MIT. Her mother, Brenda Corrie Kuehn, was a Hall of Fame golfer at Wake Forest and represented both her native Dominican Republic and the USA in the Espirito Santo Trophy a total of four times, as well as two Curtis Cups. Her father, Eric, and two uncles were Division I baseball players. Her brother Corrie played collegiate golf at Rhodes College. Kuehn herself was a state champion in tennis before focusing on golf.    

Her mother had an accomplished amateur career and twice claimed medalist honors in the U.S. Women's Mid-Amateur (1995 and 1996). She appeared in the U.S. Women's Amateur 16 times, in the U.S. Women's Open 9 times and was runner-up at the Women's Mid-Amateur in 1995. She secured the clinching point in the 1998 Curtis Cup. She made headlines in the 2001 U.S. Women's Open at Pine Needles by playing while eight months pregnant with Rachel. Brenda felt a contraction while hitting her tee shot on the 11th hole during the opening round, and eight days later delivered her daughter.

Amateur career
Kuehn appeared in the 2018 Espirito Santo Trophy for the Dominican Republic alongside her mother. She also represented the Dominican Republic at the 2019 Pan American Games in Peru.

Kuehn enrolled at Wake Forest University in 2019 to play golf with the Wake Forest Demon Deacons women's golf team. She was All-American every season and ACC Player of the Year in 2022. Kuehn's victory in the 2019 Annika Intercollegiate made her part of the first mother-daughter duo in program history to claim individual titles.

In 2020, Kuehn won the North and South Women's Amateur at Pinehurst No. 2. and reached the round of 16 in the U.S. Women's Amateur. In 2021, Kuehn earned medalist honors at the U.S. Women's Amateur, shooting a five-under 67 at Westchester Country Club for a six-under 138 total, two shots better than Kennedy Pedigo.

Kuehn appeared on the victorious American team at the 2021 Curtis Cup at Conwy Golf Club in Wales, where she defeated Scotland's Louise Duncan to secure the winning point. She again secured the clinching point in the 2022 Curtis Cup, when she closed out Caleb McGinty 2 and 1.

Playing for the United States, Kuehn earned the silver medal at the 2022 Espirito Santo Trophy in France together with Rachel Heck and Rose Zhang.

Amateur wins
2017 CGA Carolinas Amateur Championship, Bubba Conlee Tournament
2019 Annika Intercollegiate
2020 North and South Women's Amateur, Ladies National Golf Association Amateur
2021 Palmetto Intercollegiate, Ruth's Chris Tar Heel Invite
2022 Northrop Grumman Regional Challenge

Source:

Team appearances
Amateur
Espirito Santo Trophy (representing the Dominican Republic): 2018
Espirito Santo Trophy (representing the United States): 2022
Curtis Cup (representing the United States): 2021 (winners), 2022
Arnold Palmer Cup (representing the United States): 2020, 2021 (wimmers), 2022

Source:

References

American female golfers
Wake Forest Demon Deacons women's golfers
Sportspeople from Asheville, North Carolina
2001 births
Living people